ProTouch is a South African UCI Continental road cycling team established in 2016.

Team roster

Major results
2018 
  Overall Tour de Limpopo, Gustav Basson
Stage 1, Gustav Basson
Stage 3 (TTT)
2019
100 Cycle Challenge, Jayde Julius
Stage 4 Tour de Limpopo, Clint Hendricks
Challenge du Prince–Trophée Princier, Jayde Julius
Stage 4 Tour of China II, Reynard Butler
Stage 2 Tour of Peninsular, Rohan Du Plooy
2021 
Stage 10 Tour du Faso, Gustav Basson
2022
Stage 4 Tour du Rwanda, Kent Main
Stage 8 Tour du Rwanda, Moise Mugisha

References

External links

Cycling teams established in 2016
UCI Continental Teams (Africa)
Cycling teams based in South Africa